Hazrat Islam (born 4 February 1978) is a Pakistani rower. He competed in the men's lightweight double sculls event at the 2000 Summer Olympics.

References

External links
 

1978 births
Living people
Pakistani male rowers
Olympic rowers of Pakistan
Rowers at the 2000 Summer Olympics
Place of birth missing (living people)